Delaware's 13th Senate district is one of 21 districts in the Delaware Senate. It has been represented by Democrat Marie Pinkney since 2020, following her defeat of Senate President Pro Tempore David McBride in the Democratic primary.

Geography
District 13 covers much of unincorporated New Castle County to the south of Wilmington, including Red Lion, Monterey Farms, Fairwinds, Duross Heights, Clearvier Manor, and parts of Bear and Wilmington Manor.

Like all districts in the state, the 13th Senate district is located entirely within Delaware's at-large congressional district. It overlaps with the 5th, 15th, 16th, 17th, and 18th districts of the Delaware House of Representatives.

Recent election results
Delaware Senators are elected to staggered four-year terms. Under normal circumstances, the 13th district holds elections in presidential years, except immediately after redistricting, when all seats are up for election regardless of usual cycle.

2020

2016

2012

Federal and statewide results in District 13

References 

13
New Castle County, Delaware